Jan III may refer to:

 Jan III van Diest (died 1340)
 Jan III of Oświęcim (1366–1405)
 Jan III van Montfoort (c. 1448 – 1522)
 John III, Lord of Bergen op Zoom (1452–1532)
 John III Sobieski (1629–1696)
 Jan III Sobieski High School in Kraków